Ghyanglekh is a Rural municipality located within the Sindhuli District of the Bagmati Province of Nepal.
The municipality spans  of area, with a total population of 13,661 according to a 2011 Nepal census.

On March 10, 2017, the Government of Nepal restructured the local level bodies into 753 new local level structures.
The previous Amale, Bastipur, Tamajor, Netrakali and Shanteshwari VDCs were merged to form Ghyanglekh Rural Municipality.
Ghyanglekh is divided into 5 wards, with Bastipur declared the administrative center of the rural municipality.

References

External links
official website of the rural municipality

Rural municipalities in Sindhuli District
Rural municipalities of Nepal established in 2017